ITC Hotels is an Indian hotel chain, based out of Gurgaon. With over 100 hotels, it is India's fifth largest hotel chain. It is a part of the ITC Limited group of companies. It has a franchise agreement to operate most of its hotels as part of The Luxury Collection of Marriott International.

History
ITC Limited entered the hotel business on 18 October 1975 with the opening of a hotel in Chennai, which was renamed as Welcomhotel By ITC Hotels, Cathedral Road, Chennai.

ITC Hotels has hosted many visiting royalty and world leaders, including George W. Bush, Vladimir Putin, and Barack Obama. and Donald Trump.

The hotel chain works on a philosophy of "Responsible Luxury" and each hotel in the chain has a LEED (Leadership in Energy and Environmental Design) Platinum rating.

Originally incorporated as Rama Hotels Pvt Ltd in 1972 and renamed Vishwarama Hotels in 1973. The Vazir Sultan Tobacco Co Ltd. (VST Industries) bought Vishwarama Hotels in 1980-1981 and soon after, in 1982, the first luxury hotel for the new chain opened in Bangalore.

In 1984, ITC Ltd. bought the entire equity capital from VST. In 1985 the Indian government awarded the Hotel that would later become the ITC Gardenia a five star rating. 

The company name was changed from ITC Ltd. to ITC Hotels in 1986.

ITC Hotels Brands

The group today operates under several distinct brands:
ITC Hotels, which has 14 hotels
Welcomhotel by ITC Hotels, which has 20+ hotels
Fortune Hotels, which has 35+ hotels
WelcomHeritage, which has 50+ hotels

References

External links

Hotel chains in India
Hotels established in 1975
Companies based in Kolkata
1975 establishments in West Bengal
ITC Limited